Luis Rossi is an internationally renowned clarinetist. He performed as Principal clarinetist in symphony orchestras throughout South America for twenty years before he founded a clarinet workshop in Santiago, Chile, in 1986. Since then he has also focused on his work as a soloist and has offered master classes at institutions such as Indiana University (Bloomington, USA), Michigan State University (Lansing, USA), Ohio State University (Columbus, USA), Royal College of Music (London, England), the International Clarinet and Saxophone Connection at the New England Conservatory of Music (2002) and the Belgian Clarinet Academy (Ostend Conservatory). He has recorded four compact discs using Rossi Rosewood and African Blackwood clarinets.

The professional Rossi clarinet is a very popular instrument for artists throughout the world. In his 20 years of making clarinets, Mr. Rossi has become one of the very few clarinet designers in the world, and an acknowledged expert in clarinet acoustics.

In 2005, Luis Rossi partnered with the Brazilian factory Weril Instrumentos Musicais and the Gemstone Musical Instruments to create Andino Clarinets, a student-level version of his professional instruments.

References

External links
 Luis Rossi Website
 Andino Clarinets website
  Andino Clarinets article
  Music Trader article

Living people
Indiana University faculty
Michigan State University faculty
Ohio State University faculty
Year of birth missing (living people)
Clarinet makers